The following article presents a summary of the 2003 football (soccer) season in Paraguay.

First division results

Torneo Apertura
The Apertura tournament was played in a single all-play-all system. At the end, the top six teams qualified to a playoff stage to determine the Apertura champion.

Apertura playoff stage
The top six teams qualified to this stage and were divided into two groups. The top two teams in the Apertura points table (Libertad and Cerro Porteño) were given two bonus points to start the group stage.

Group stage

Group A

Group B

Apertura Final

Libertad wins the Apertura tournament final by an aggregate score of 1-0.

Torneo Clausura
The Clausura tournament was played in a two-round all-play-all system, with the champion being the team with the most points at the end of the two rounds.

*Since Olimpia and Libertad tied in points and goal difference at the end of the Clausura, a championship game playoff was played on November 30, with Libertad winning 6-5 in penalties after a 0-0 tie in regulation.

Championship game playoff
Since Libertad won both the Apertura and Clausura tournaments they were declared as the national champions and no playoff game was played.

Runners-up game playoff
Two games were played to determine the 2003 championship runners-up between Olimpia and Guaraní, who finished in second place in the Clausura and Apertura respectively. The winner of this playoff was guaranteed a spot in the 2003 Copa Libertadores.

Guaraní runners-up of the 2003 first division tournament by winning on an aggregate score of 4-3.

Relegation / Promotion
 San Lorenzo automatically relegated to the second division after finishing last in the average points table based over a three-year period.
Tacuary finished second-to-last in the aggregate points table, so had to participate in the promotion play-off game against second division runners-up 3 de Febrero. Tacuary won the playoff game by an aggregate score of 4-2, so it remains in the first division.
 Club Nacional promoted to the first division by winning the second division tournament.

Qualification to international competitions
Libertad qualified to the 2004 Copa Libertadores by winning the Torneo Apertura and Torneo Clausura.
Guaraní qualified to the 2004 Copa Libertadores by finishing as runners-up of the 2003 season.
A four team playoff was played to determine the 3rd participant in the 2004 Copa Libertadores. Olimpia entered the playoff with one bonus point because it finished second in the Clausura tournament.

Pre-Libertadores playoff

Olimpia qualifies to the 2004 Copa Libertadores by winning the Pre-Libertadores tournament.

Lower divisions results

Paraguayan teams in international competitions
Copa Libertadores 2003:
Olimpia: round of 16
Cerro Porteño: round of 16
Libertad: group-stage
12 de Octubre: group-stage
Recopa Sudamericana 2003:
Olimpia: Champions
Copa Sudamericana 2003:
Libertad: quarterfinals
Guaraní: preliminary first round

Paraguay national team
The following table lists all the games played by the Paraguay national football team in official competitions during 2003.

References
 Paraguay 2003 by Eli Schmerler and Juan Pablo Andrés at RSSSF
 Diario ABC Color

 
Seasons in Paraguayan football
Paraguay 2003